Rainer Ludwig Claisen (14 January 1851 – 5 January 1930) was a German chemist best known for his work with condensations of carbonyls and sigmatropic rearrangements. He was born in Cologne as the son of a jurist and studied chemistry at the university of Bonn (1869), where he became a member of K.St.V. Arminia. He served in the army as a nurse in 1870–1871 and continued his studies at Göttingen University. He returned to the University of Bonn in 1872 and started his academic career at the same university in 1874. He died in 1930 in Godesberg am Rhein (near Bonn).

Career

Scientific contributions 

 Described the condensation of aromatic aldehydes with aliphatic aldehydes or ketones in 1881. This variation of the now well-known aldol condensation reaction is called the Claisen–Schmidt condensation.
 Discovered (1887) the condensation reaction of an ester with an activated methylene group, now known as the Claisen condensation.
 Synthesis of cinnamates by reacting aromatic aldehydes with esters. The reaction is known as the Claisen reaction and was described by Claisen for the first time in 1890.
 Discovered the thermally induced rearrangement of allyl phenyl ether in 1912. He details its reaction mechanism in his last scientific publication (1925). In his honor, the reaction has been named the Claisen rearrangement.
 Synthesis of isatin via a process known as the Claisen isatin synthesis, described for the first time in 1879.
 Designer of a special distillation flask, now known as the Claisen flask. With the increased modularity of modern glassware this functionality is now often achieved with a Claisen adapter, of which there are many types, attached to a normal flask.

See also
Cinnamic acid
Dibenzylideneacetone
Tetrahedral carbonyl addition compound

References

W Pötsch. Lexikon bedeutender Chemiker (VEB Bibliographisches Institut Leipzig, 1989)

Notes

1851 births
1930 deaths
Organic chemists
20th-century German chemists
University of Bonn alumni
Academic staff of the University of Bonn
19th-century German chemists